UFC 237: Namajunas vs. Andrade was a mixed martial arts event produced by the Ultimate Fighting Championship that was held on May 11, 2019, at Jeunesse Arena in Rio de Janeiro, Brazil.

Background
The event was originally expected to be held at Arena da Baixada in Curitiba. However, the event was relocated to Jeunesse Arena in Rio de Janeiro, after the UFC failed to come to terms with Athletico Paranaense.

A UFC Women's Strawweight Championship bout between current champion Rose Namajunas and Jéssica Andrade served as the event headliner.

A bout between former bantamweight title challenger Bethe Correia and Irene Aldana took place at the event. The match up was originally scheduled to take place in August 2018 at UFC 227, but Correia pulled out of that event, citing injury. At the weigh-ins, Correia weighed in at 141 pounds, 5 pounds over the women's bantamweight non-title fight limit of 136. As a result, Correia was fined 30 percent of her purse, and the bout proceeded at a catchweight.

A bantamweight bout between Talita Bernardo and Jessica-Rose Clark was scheduled at the event. However, it was reported on April 3, 2019 Clark pulled out of the bout citing injury and was replaced by promotional newcomer Melissa Gatto. In turn, Gatto was pulled from the fight in the days leading up to the event and replaced by Viviane Araújo.

A flyweight bout between Luana Carolina and Wu Yanan was scheduled at the event. However it was reported on April 22, 2019 that Wu pulled out of the bout due to injury and she was replaced by Priscila Cachoeira.

A bantamweight bout between Said Nurmagomedov and Raoni Barcelos at the event. However, it was reported on May 1, 2019 that Nurmagomedov pulled out of the bout for undisclosed reason and he was replaced by newcomer Carlos Huachin.

A lightweight bout between Carlos Diego Ferreira and Francisco Trinaldo was scheduled to take place as part of the main card. However, Ferreira was forced out of the bout on weigh-in day as he was deemed medically unfit due to a weight cutting issue. As a result, the bout was cancelled.

Results

Bonus awards
The following fighters received $50,000 bonuses:
Fight of the Night: Jéssica Andrade vs. Rose Namajunas
Performance of the Night: Jéssica Andrade and Warlley Alves

See also 

 List of UFC events
 2019 in UFC
 List of current UFC fighters

References 

Ultimate Fighting Championship events
2019 in mixed martial arts
Mixed martial arts in Brazil
International sports competitions in Rio de Janeiro (city)
2019 in Brazilian sport
May 2019 sports events in South America